Footsbarn Theatre is a touring theatre company established in 1971.

History

Footsbarn started life in London, in the United Kingdom in 1970) at the Drama Studio. It was an abstract idea that materialised when Oliver Foot and [[Andrew Simon
]] met at the Drama Studio in 1968. They worked on a production of Samuel Beckett's Endgame.  It began as a student production supervised by Peter Layton at the Putney Institute.  Endgame was reprised in October 1970. The first Foot's Barn production was at the St Mary Abbot Theatre in Kensington.  The Foot family had no connection with the Cornish barn that the company moved to in 1971.  The name Foot was first referred to in the London Evening Standard when Oliver announced his marriage to Nancy Bruce. During the interview Oliver was asked what his future plans were. He announced the theatre company and its upcoming production. What's the company called he was asked. It had no name at the time and discussions about the name were ongoing. Oliver blurted out Foot's Barn. Barn was a title Andrew had not favoured.  To compound the situation Oliver's brother Paul, the investigative journalist with Private Eye, had been adamant that the family name should not be used. So the name Footsbarn Theatre was born out of panic. Endgame put down the marker for Footsbarn's distinctive style. Ian Watson of South West Arts, Alan Ayckbourn's biographer, said it was the best piece of theatre he'd experienced. It was the reason why Footsbarn were given their original grant. It seems that without Mr Beckett's play Footsbarn would not exist.

The ensemble played in various British venues, including the 1979 Glastonbury Festival. "Footsbarn Travelling Theatre" left Britain in 1981 to tour the world. The company has produced more than 60 plays and have travelled to all six continents. In 1991, the troupe bought a farm called "La Chaussée" in the Allier department of the Auvergne in Central France and have since based their work there. Footsbarn performs in a custom built Theatre Tent. "La Chaussée" is Footsbarn's production centre with studios, rehearsal spaces and offices. Public workshops and performances are presented throughout the year.

External links

Footsbarn Theatre website 

Theatre companies in the United Kingdom
Theatre companies in France
Organisations based in Cornwall
Cornish culture